Erwin Aders (1881, Düsseldorf – 1974) was the chief designer for Germany's Henschel & Son during World War II. He led the design for the heavy tanks Tiger I and Tiger II.

References 

1881 births
1974 deaths
20th-century German engineers
People from Düsseldorf
Engineers from North Rhine-Westphalia
Tank designers